"Deja Vu" is a song by American singer Prince Royce and Colombian singer-songwriter Shakira. The song was released on February 24, 2017  as the fourth single taken from Royce's fifth studio album, Five. The song was also included on Shakira's album El Dorado.

Music video
The music video for "Deja Vu" premiered on March 24, 2017 on Prince Royce's Vevo account on YouTube. The music video has surpassed over 500 million views on the platform.

Accolades

Live performances
Shakira performed "Deja Vu" with Prince Royce at The Temple House in Miami in the release party for El Dorado on 25 May 2017.

Charts

Weekly charts

Year-end charts

All time charts

Certifications

References

2017 singles
Prince Royce songs
Shakira songs
Sony Music Latin singles
Songs written by Prince Royce
Songs written by Shakira
2017 songs
Spanish-language songs
Male–female vocal duets
Songs written by Daniel Santacruz